Akure Forest Reserve is a protected area in southwest Nigeria, covering .

In recent decades, there has been a large deforestation in this area, which has a huge impact on the environment. Akure Forest reserve is a forested area set aside for preservation or controlled use and located at Ile Oluji/Okeigbo, Ondo State, Nigeria, with a Latitude of 7° 17′ 39″ N and Longitude of 5° 2′ 3″ E.

References

Forest Reserves of Nigeria